Monsta or other variations may refer to:

 Animonsta Studios, Monsta is official short name for Malaysian animation studio.
 I See Monstas (previously MONSTA), a British electronic music group
 Monsta Boy, a UK garage duo
 Monsta Island Czars, an American hip-hop collective
 Monsta Mack, an American professional wrestler
 Monsta X, a South Korean boy band
 Monstah Black, an American dancer and performance artist
 Monsta (EP), the debut extended play by I See MONSTAS
 "Monsta!!", a 1995 single by American punk rock band Supernova
 "Monsta", a 2019 single by New Zealand singer Benee from the EP Stella & Steve